

208001–208100 

|-bgcolor=#f2f2f2
| colspan=4 align=center | 
|}

208101–208200 

|-bgcolor=#f2f2f2
| colspan=4 align=center | 
|}

208201–208300 

|-bgcolor=#f2f2f2
| colspan=4 align=center | 
|}

208301–208400 

|-id=351
| 208351 Sielmann ||  || Heinz Sielmann (1917–2006), German wildlife photographer, zoologist and documentary filmmaker. || 
|}

208401–208500 

|-id=425
| 208425 Zehavi ||  || Idit Zehavi (born 1969), an Israel-American astrophysicist and a contributor to the Sloan Digital Sky Survey || 
|-id=499
| 208499 Shokasonjuku ||  || The Shōkasonjuku Academy, a former private school located in Hagi city, Yamaguchi prefecture || 
|}

208501–208600 

|-bgcolor=#f2f2f2
| colspan=4 align=center | 
|}

208601–208700 

|-bgcolor=#f2f2f2
| colspan=4 align=center | 
|}

208701–208800 

|-bgcolor=#f2f2f2
| colspan=4 align=center | 
|}

208801–208900 

|-bgcolor=#f2f2f2
| colspan=4 align=center | 
|}

208901–209000 

|-id=915
| 208915 Andrewashcraft ||  || Andrew Ashcraft (1984–2013), one of the 19 Granite Mountain Hotshots, who lost their lives fighting the 2013 Yarnell Hill Fire in Arizona || 
|-id=916
| 208916 Robertcaldwell ||  || Robert Caldwell (1990–2013), one of the 19 Granite Mountain Hotshots, who lost their lives fighting the 2013 Yarnell Hill Fire in Arizona || 
|-id=917
| 208917 Traviscarter ||  || Travis Carter (1982–2013), one of the 19 Granite Mountain Hotshots, who lost their lives fighting the 2013 Yarnell Hill Fire in Arizona || 
|}

References 

208001-209000